Ágnes Szávay (born 29 December 1988) is a former professional tennis player from Hungary. The 2007 WTA Newcomer of the Year achieved her career-high ranking of world No. 13 in April 2008.

Personal life
Szávay was born in Kiskunhalas and grew up in Soltvadkert. She started to play tennis at the age of six, with her parents acting as her first coaches and managers. She worked with several coaches including Zoltán Újhidy, Levente Barátosi, Miklós Hornok, József Bocskay, Zoltán Kuharszky, Karl-Heinz Wetter and Gábor Köves. Her younger sister Blanka is five years her junior.

Tennis career

2006
In 2006, she made it to the final of the Ashland Challenger tournament, but lost there to Aleksandra Wozniak in straight sets.

2007
Szávay won her first career WTA-level tournament in singles in Palermo in July. The win caused her ranking to rise to world No. 37. She also won one doubles tournament, the Tier III Budapest Grand Prix, with Vladimíra Uhlířová.

In August, Szávay reached the final of the Tier II tournament in New Haven, defeating Daniela Hantuchová, Alona Bondarenko, and Samantha Stosur, then lost to Svetlana Kuznetsova in the final. Szávay was leading 6–4, 0–3 when she had to retire from the match because of a back injury.

Szávay reached the quarterfinals of the US Open, defeating 32nd-seeded Michaëlla Krajicek and seventh-seeded Nadia Petrova, then lost to Kuznetsova. She also reached the semifinals in women's doubles, teaming with Uhlířová.

At her first tournament after the US Open, she reached the final of the Tier II China Open. Szávay, the sixth seed, reached the semifinals where she defeated Chinese player Peng Shuai to advance to her second career Tier II final. Szávay then defeated Jelena Janković to claim her first Tier II title. Szávay led 5–0 in the first set tiebreak before losing it 7–9. In the second set, Szávay saved a match point while trailing 5–1 with a second serve ace and then won nine consecutive games. Szávay moved into the top 20 due to this result.

Szávay's year ended prematurely because of a thigh injury. In late September at the Tier IV Hansol Korea Open Tennis Championships in Seoul, she was forced to retire from her quarterfinal match with Eleni Daniilidou while tied at one set apiece. She did not play on the tour the remainder of the year.

For her achievements, she was named "2007 Hungarian Sportswoman of the Year".

2008

Szávay began the year at the Mondial Australian Women's Hardcourt in Gold Coast. Szávay and Dinara Safina, the third seeded team, won the doubles title, defeating the first and second seeded teams in the semifinals and final, respectively.

Szávay reached the final of the Tier II Open Gaz de France in Paris. She defeated second-seeded Daniela Hantuchová in the quarterfinals and fourth-seeded Elena Dementieva in the semifinals, then lost to Anna Chakvetadze in the three-set final.

Szávay started the clay court season by reaching the quarterfinals in three consecutive tournaments. At the Tier II Bausch & Lomb Championships in Amelia Island, Szávay lost to Lindsay Davenport in the quarterfinals. Going into the Tier I Family Circle Cup in Charleston, Szávay was ranked world No. 13, her highest singles ranking; she reached the quarterfinals but eventually lost to Alizé Cornet in two sets. At the Tier I Qatar Telecom German Open in Berlin, Szávay lost to world No. 2 Ana Ivanovic in three sets.

2009

At the 2009 French Open, Szávay was seeded 29th and upset world No. 3 Venus Williams, beating her in the third round. She was defeated in straight sets by Dominika Cibulková in the fourth round. She won the third title of her career in her hometown at GDF Suez Grand Prix defeating top seed Patty Schnyder in the final.

2010
Szávay reached her first quarterfinals of the year at the Open GDF Suez and then reached the quarterfinals at the Abierto Mexicano TELCEL and the Monterrey Open. In the summer, she won back-to-back titles at the GDF Suez Grand Prix and the ECM Prague Open.

2011
Szávay won her first match in nearly five months at the BNP Paribas Open. After the French Open, she took time off to recover from a back injury.

2012
Szávay lost in several first rounds, including the Porsche Tennis Grand Prix, the Olympics, the New Haven Open at Yale, and the US Open.

2013
On 6 February 2013, Szávay announced retirement from professional tennis due to ongoing back problems.

Career statistics

Grand Slam performance timelines

Singles

Doubles

References

External links

 
 
 
 Szávay statistics
  

1988 births
Living people
People from Kiskunhalas
Hungarian female tennis players
Tennis players at the 2008 Summer Olympics
Olympic tennis players of Hungary
French Open junior champions
Wimbledon junior champions
Tennis players at the 2012 Summer Olympics
Grand Slam (tennis) champions in girls' singles
Grand Slam (tennis) champions in girls' doubles
Sportspeople from Bács-Kiskun County